Grandparents' Day or National Grandparents' Day is a secular holiday celebrated in various countries; it is celebrated to show the bond between grandparents and grandchildren. It occurs on various days of the year, either as one holiday or sometimes as a separate Grandmothers' Day and   Grandfather's Day (see below for dates by country).

History

In the United States, Russell Capper (age 9 in 1969) sent a letter to President Nixon suggesting a special day be set aside as Grandparents' Day. 
On June 12, 1969, he received a letter back from Rose Mary Woods (Personal Secretary to the President) reading, "Dear Russell, Thank you for your letter to President Nixon. Your suggestion regarding a Grandparent’s Day is appreciated, but the President ordinarily issues proclamations designating periods for special observance only when a Congressional resolution authorizes him to do so. With best wishes, Sincerely, Rose Mary Woods Personal Secretary to the President".

Since the aforementioned letter, Marian McQuade was recognized nationally by the United States Senate – in particular by Senators Jennings Randolph and Robert Byrd – and by President Jimmy Carter, as the founder of National Grandparents Day. McQuade made it her goal to educate the youth in the community about the important contributions seniors have made throughout history. She also urged the youth to "adopt" a grandparent, not just for one day a year, but rather for a lifetime. Co-founder Cynthia Bennett, who worked for Marian's husband, contributed by writing letters of verification.

In 1973, Senator Jennings Randolph introduced a resolution to the senate to make Grandparents' Day a national holiday. West Virginia's Governor Arch Moore had proclaimed an annual Grandparents' Day for the state, at the urging of Marian McQuade.  When Senator Randolph's resolution in the U.S. Senate died in committee, Marian McQuade organized supporters and began contacting governors, senators, and congressmen in all fifty states.  She urged each state to proclaim their own Grandparents' Day. Within three years, she had received Grandparents' Day proclamations from forty-three states. She sent copies of the proclamations to Senator Randolph.

In February 1977, Senator Randolph, with the concurrence of many other senators, introduced a joint resolution to the senate requesting the president to "issue annually a proclamation designating the first Sunday of September after Labor Day of each year as 'National Grandparents' Day'."  Congress passed the legislation proclaiming the first Sunday after Labor Day as National Grandparents' Day and, on August 3, 1978,  then-President Jimmy Carter signed the proclamation. The statute cites the day's purpose: "...to honor grandparents, to give grandparents an opportunity to show love for their children's children, and to help children become aware of strength, information, and guidance older people can offer".

Grandparents' days around the world

International
In 2021, Pope Francis declared World Day for Grandparents and the Elderly, to take place annually on the fourth Sunday of July, neighboring the memorial of Sts. Joachim and Anne, the grandparents of Jesus.

Australia
In at least some states of Australia, Grandparents' Day is celebrated annually, on the last Sunday in October.

Bangladesh
In Bangladesh, the National Grandparents Day is celebrated on 9 September to honor and express gratitude towards their constant love, care, and support.

Brazil
In Brazil, Grandparents' Day (Portuguese: Dia dos avós) is celebrated on July 26.

Canada
National Grandparents' Day began in Canada in 1995 but was discontinued in 2014. Motion number 273 submitted in the House of Commons by Sarkis Assadourian in 1995 read:

That, in the opinion of this House, the government should consider designating the second Sunday in September of each year as Grandparents' Day in order to acknowledge their importance to the structure of the family in the nurturing, upbringing and education of children.

Estonia
In Estonia, Grandparents' Day (Vanavanemate päev) is celebrated on the second Sunday in September.

France
In France, Grandmothers' Day (La fête des grands-mères) was launched in 1987 by a brand of coffee (Café Grand'Mère), part of the Kraft Jacobs Suchard Group. The date is now included in French calendars and is celebrated on the first Sunday in March.

Germany
In Germany, Grandmothers' Day was established in 2010 and is celebrated on the second Sunday in October.

Hong Kong
Junior Chamber International Victoria introduced the first Grandparents' Day in Hong Kong in 1990. It is celebrated on the second Sunday in October.

Italy
In Italy, Grandparents' Day (officially Festa Nazionale dei Nonni, "National Grandparents' Feast") was established in 2005 and is celebrated on October 2, Guardian Angels' Day in the Roman Catholic Church.

Japan
In Japan, Respect for the Aged Day was established as National Holiday in 1966 and is celebrated on the third Monday of September.

Mexico
In Mexico, Grandparents' Day is celebrated on August 28.

Netherlands
In the Netherlands, "Opa en Oma Dag" was created in 2004 and falls on June 4. It is not widely celebrated and to many people in the Netherlands it is completely unknown. The day was envisioned as a day for grandparents/great-grandparents to spend time in enjoyable activities with their (great-)grandchildren, in order to strengthen the bond between the generations and to increase respect and appreciation for senior citizens in general. One idea that has been promoted is the "adoption" of a grandmother or grandfather - for the day, or for life.

Philippines
In the Philippines, Grandparents' Day is celebrated every second Sunday of September. The country started celebrating this event in 1987.

Grandparents' Day in the Philippines is also a family day. Many commercial establishments organize special events and give special privileges for the elderly people: free concerts, meal discounts, free medical checkups, flowers, etc.

Poland
In Poland, "Grandma's Day" was created in 1964 by the Kobieta i Życie magazine, and popularized from 1965 onwards. It is celebrated on January 21. "Grandpa's Day" is celebrated a day later, on January 22.

Russia
Russia celebrates Grandparents' Day on October 28. The Grandparents' Day started being celebrated by the ancient slavs. The day was supposed to consolidate the connection with ancestors and bring together all generations.

Singapore
Singapore started celebrating Grandparents' Day in 1979, a year after the U.S. started. It is celebrated on the fourth Sunday in November.

South Sudan
South Sudan started celebrating Grandparents' Day in 2013, with the date set as the second Sunday in November.

Portugal
In Portugal, Grandparents' Day is celebrated on July 26.

Spain
In Spain, Grandparents' Day is celebrated on July 26, the feast day of Saint Joachim and Saint Anne, parents of Mary, the mother of Jesus.

Taiwan
The Ministry of Education (Republic of China) initiated Grandparents' Day (祖父母節, Zǔfùmǔ Jié) in Taiwan on 29 August 2010, on the fourth Sunday in August annually, shortly before school children would start a new schoolyear.

United Kingdom
The day was introduced to the UK in 1990 by the charity Age Concern but it has not been widely accepted by the British public. It has been celebrated on the first Sunday in October since 2008,

United States
Congress passed the legislation proclaiming the first Sunday after Labor Day as National Grandparents' Day in the U.S. and, on August 3, 1978, then-President Jimmy Carter signed the proclamation.

The flower of the U.S. National Grandparents Day is the forget-me-not which blooms in the spring. As a result, seasonal flowers are given in appreciation to grandparents on this day.

Music

In 2004, the National Grandparents Day Council of Chula Vista, California announced that A Song for Grandma and Grandpa by Johnny Prill would be their official song of the U.S. National Grandparents Day holiday.

The National Grandparents' Day Council presented Prill with an award in recognition of his composition A Song for Grandma and Grandpa.

See also 
 Father's Day
 Mother's Day

Notes

References

External links
National Grandparents Day Council official page (U.S.)
Generations United (U.S.)
U.S. Code , the law establishing the U.S. National Grandparents Day

Family member holidays
Public holidays in the United States
Public holidays in Canada
January observances
March observances
August observances
September observances
October observances
November observances
Moveable holidays (US Labor Day date based)
1978 establishments in the United States
Sunday observances